The Ever Passing Moment is the fifth studio album by punk rock band MxPx, released on May 16, 2000.

MxPx gained critical recognition for this album and landed a slot supporting for The Offspring and Cypress Hill on the Conspiracy of One tour. "Responsibility" proved to be a minor radio hit, peaking at #24 on the Billboard Modern Rock chart. Bassist Mike Herrera said on the It Came From Bremerton VHS tape that his song writing on The Ever Passing Moment was inspired by Elvis Costello's second album This Year's Model.

The intro countdown in the song "The Next Big Thing" is Dave Grohl screaming "1, 2, 3, go!".

Track listing
All songs written by Mike Herrera.

Personnel
 Mike Herrera - bass, vocals
 Tom Wisniewski - guitar, backing vocals
 Yuri Ruley - drums
 Dave Grohl - introduction on "The Next Big Thing"
 Stephen Egerton (Descendents) - guitar
 Chip Butters - assistant engineer
 Jerry Finn - producer, engineer, mixing
 Lior Goldenberg - engineer, assistant engineer
 Sean O'Dwyer - engineer
 Darrel Thorpe - assistant engineer

Charts

References

MxPx albums
2000 albums
A&M Records albums
Albums produced by Jerry Finn